{|
{{Infobox ship image
| Ship image = 
| Ship caption = AS-28' surfacing in the Bering Sea
}}

|}

The Priz class (Project 1855) is a type of Deep Submergence Rescue Vehicle (DSRV) operated by the government of Russia.  There are known to be at least five vessels of the class, several of which were involved in the failed rescue attempt when the Kursk sank on 12 August 2000. The Russian word "Priz" (“приз”) means "prize".

 Specifications 
The titanium hulled vessels are 13.5 m long, 3.8 m wide and 4.6 m high, with a displacement of 55 tonnes. With a crew of four, they can stay submerged for up to 120 hours, but with the crew and a full complement of 20 passengers aboard this is reduced to 10 hours. The Priz vessels are equipped with manipulators that can lift up to 50 kg.

According to a report on Russian television (Vesti, on Rossiya channel, August 7, 2005), the Project 1855 Priz vessel was designed by the Lazurit Design Bureau of Nizhny Novgorod, and four modifications were made: AS-26 (1986), AS-28 (1989), AS-30 (1989), and AS-34 (1991).

Operations
The Priz is thought to be operable either manned or unmanned with a battery endurance of three hours.  Over the 2006-2016 years, an upgrade of the class to improve its navigational, search and life-support ability was conducted.

The Priz submarines are carried by Pionier Moskvyy class submersible support ships (Project 05360/05361), which can carry up to two of the submarines.  The ships are equipped with special equipment to deploy Priz in rough seas.

List of boats
There are currently four Priz vessels operating.
 
  (disabled off the coast of Kamchatka, August 5, rescued August 7, 2005)
 
 

See also
 
 
 
 

 External links 
 Navy Recognition
 Rescuing the Rescue Sub - Hammernews''
 Priz Class Submarines - Complete Ship List (English)

 
Kursk submarine disaster